Brest Business School, also called ESC Bretagne Brest, France, is a French business School in the city of Brest in western France.

Founded in 1962, Brest BS provides business and management courses to 900 students. Currently, the school offers seven different programmes both in French and in English. The school is supported by the Chamber of Commerce and Industry of Brest. In January 2013, the school merged with three others to found France Business School. After the end of France Business School, as of January 2015, ESC Bretagne Brest regained its independence, thus also changing its name to Brest Business School.

Accreditations and associations 
 Member of the Conférence des Grandes Écoles
 A school authorised to deliver master's degrees
 Member of the management chapter of the Conférence des Grandes Écoles
 Member of the Fondation Nationale pour l’Enseignement de la Gestion des Entreprises (FNEGE)
 Member of the European Foundation for Management Development (EFMD)
 Member of the EISB (Entrepreneurship, Innovation and Small Business)
 Member of the Association to Advance Collegiate Schools of Business (AACSB International)
 Member of Produit en Bretagne (Produced in Brittany)
 Member of Campus responsables

Notable alumni 
 Graziella Melchior, French politician
 Laury Thilleman, French journalist, model, TV Host, actress

References

External links
 Official website

Business schools in France
Education in Brest, France
Educational institutions established in 1962
1962 establishments in France